Amanda Meta Marshall (born August 29, 1972) is a Canadian pop-rock singer. She has released three studio albums; the first was certified Diamond in Canada, with the latter two certified 3× Platinum and Platinum respectively. She is best known for her 1996 single, "Birmingham", which reached number 3 in Canada and was her only song to reach the US charts.

Early life
Marshall was born in Toronto, Ontario, Canada.
She grew up an only child, in her own words, "the product of an interracial marriage": her mother is from Trinidad, her father is Canadian. In several of her songs, Marshall has reflected on her racial identity "as a woman who looks white but is actually black".

Marshall studied music extensively during her childhood, including at the Royal Conservatory of Music in Toronto. While performing on the Queen Street West bar scene in her teens, she met guitarist Jeff Healey, who was struck by her powerful voice and took her on tour for a long time.

Career

Debut album and critical success
Marshall signed a recording contract with Metalblade Records in 1991, but both parties agreed that they were not a good fit and went their separate ways. In 1994, Marshall signed to Epic Records, and contributed to the Neil Young tribute album Borrowed Tunes: A Tribute to Neil Young the same year. Her debut album Amanda Marshall was released the following year in 1995. The album was a major success in Canada, generating a great deal of airplay and spawning six Top 40 hits—"Let It Rain", "Beautiful Goodbye", "Dark Horse", "Fall From Grace", "Sitting on Top of the World", and "Birmingham", her most successful hit in Canada and the only song to reach the US charts.

In 1996, Marshall's song "This Could Take All Night" was included in the original soundtrack of Tin Cup. In 1997, Marshall's song "I'll Be Okay" was included in the original soundtrack of My Best Friend's Wedding.

1999–2000: Tuesday's Child and further success
In 1999, she released a successful follow-up album, Tuesday's Child. It followed in the same vein as her debut, with a mix of soulful pop songs and ballads, characterizing her powerful voice. Her song "Ride" from that album was featured in The Replacements and on its soundtrack. In autumn 1999, she supported Whitney Houston on the European leg of her My Love Is Your Love World Tour. Another single from that album, "Believe In You", was featured on one episode of Touched by an Angel and on its soundtrack as well as the 2002 direct-to-video film Kermit's Swamp Years, while Richie Sambora of Bon Jovi was the guest guitarist on the track "Why Don't You Love Me". She also co wrote a song "Right Here All Along" with Carole King, who also performed background vocals on the track. She was nominated as best songwriter at the 2000 Juno Awards.

2001–present: Everybody's Got a Story and further releases
In 2001, Marshall released her third album, Everybody's Got a Story. It marked a change in style and sound for Marshall, with a noticeable R&B influence. Her singles "Everybody's Got a Story" and "Sunday Morning After" received some Canadian airplay, and for the album, Marshall worked with the likes of Peter Asher and Billy Mann.

Marshall's absence from the music scene was due to legal battles with her record label after she fired her management in 2002. As the disputes over how royalties from the singles are to be apportioned are not yet settled, Marshall is not allowed to reveal the substance of the disputes.

In 2003, she released a greatest hits album entitled Intermission: The Singles Collection, which was followed by another greatest hits album, Collections, in 2006. In 2008, yet another greatest hits album, The Steel Box Collection, was released.

In a 2012 radio interview, Marshall announced that she was working on a new album. In the interview, she explained to the radio host that "a new CD is in the works", and that she was "hopeful" of its release in 2013, however this did not eventuate. In an article, she said that the record was "70% done". Amanda's career got a huge boost when Elton John named her as an artist he's currently listening to, when he appeared on The Rosie Show.

Discography

Studio albums

Compilations

Singles

Promotional singles

References

External links

 

1972 births
Living people
Canadian people of Trinidad and Tobago descent
The Royal Conservatory of Music alumni
Canadian women singer-songwriters
Musicians from Toronto
Epic Records artists
21st-century Black Canadian women singers
Canadian women pop singers
20th-century Black Canadian women singers